Matej Maglica (born 25 September 1998) is a Croatian professional footballer who plays as a centre-back for Swiss club St. Gallen.

Club career
A youth product of the Croatian club Marsonia, Maglica moved to Germany with the youth academy of Backnang in 2015. He was promoted to their reserves, and eventually their senior team in 2017 before transferring to Göppingen. He joined Stuttgart II in June 2020, and after a successful debut season signed an extension on 2 April 2021. He made his professional debut with Stuttgart in a 1–0 Bundesliga loss to Arminia Bielefeld on 6 November 2021.

On 3 January 2022, Maglica joined St. Gallen on loan until the end of the season. On 7 June 2022, St. Gallen exercised their option to purchase Maglica's contract.

References

External links
 
 DFB Profile
 FuPa Profile

1998 births
Living people
Sportspeople from Slavonski Brod
Association football central defenders
Croatian footballers
VfB Stuttgart II players
VfB Stuttgart players
FC St. Gallen players
Regionalliga players
Bundesliga players
Swiss Super League players
Croatian expatriate footballers
Expatriate footballers in Germany
Croatian expatriate sportspeople in Germany
Expatriate footballers in Switzerland
Croatian expatriate sportspeople in Switzerland